Byron M. Baer (October 18, 1929 – June 24, 2007) was an American Democratic Party politician from New Jersey who served in both houses of the New Jersey Legislature. He served in the New Jersey General Assembly from 1972 to 1993 and in the State Senate from 1994 to 2005, where he represented the 37th Legislative District. In the early 1970s, Baer was the primary author of the Open Public Records Act, New Jersey's Sunshine Law, and was an advocate of open government throughout his legislative career.

Career
In the upper house, the Senator filled a variety of different leadership roles including as Democratic Senate Leader Ex Officio (2002–2003), Minority Leader Pro Tempore (1996–2001), and as Senate Leader Ex Officio, a post he held from 2004.

As Senator, Baer served on a variety of Senate Committees including: Legislative Services Commission, Joint Committee on Public Schools, State Government, and Judiciary. He was also the Chairman of the Senate Commerce Committee.

Before serving as a State Senator, Baer served 21 years in the lower house of the New Jersey Legislature, the New Jersey General Assembly, from 1972 to 1993. While in the Assembly, Baer served in a variety of different posts including  Minority Leader Pro Tempore (1992–1993), Deputy Speaker (1991), Associate Assembly Leader (1990), and Assistant Minority Leader (1986–1989).

In February 1993, Baer announced that he would run for the seat in the New Jersey Senate being vacated by Matthew Feldman. Together with Assembly running mates Loretta Weinberg and Ken Zisa, who was on the ballot for Baer's former Assembly seat, Baer won election to the Senate.

Baer attended Cornell University, New York University and Columbia University, but never received a degree.

Baer had a short-lived career in special effects, which included work on the horror classic, The Brain That Wouldn't Die.

In 1961, Baer was arrested as a Freedom Rider at the Greyhound Bus station in Jackson, Mississippi, and served six weeks in the Mississippi State Penitentiary. In 1965, he participated in the Selma to Montgomery marches.  Baer advised and befriended Martin Luther King Jr. Because of this, Baer served, from 2002 to 2004, on New Jersey's standing Martin Luther King Jr. Commemorative Commission,  which works to raise public awareness of King's ideals and philosophy.

Senator Baer resigned from the New Jersey Senate effective September 8, 2005, due to health reasons. In a letter to Acting Governor of New Jersey Richard Codey, Baer stated that "I officially tender my resignation as State Senator, representing District 37 in the New Jersey Legislature, effective today, September 8, 2005, at 11:59 p.m." On Election Day on November 9, 2005, voters chose Loretta Weinberg to serve the remaining portion of Baer's four-year term of office, which ended in January 2008.

Succession in Senate
After Baer's resignation, Assemblywoman Loretta Weinberg of Teaneck and Hackensack Police Chief Ken Zisa faced off in balloting by the Bergen County Democratic Committee on September 15. 2005. to fill Baer's seat on an interim basis and to fill his ballot spot for the November General Election.

Zisa outpolled Weinberg at the September 15 caucus, with Representative Steve Rothman — in his role overseeing the Special Convention — ruling that ballots from the so-called "Tenafly Five" should not be counted, as their names had not been filed with the County Committee within the prescribed thirty-day limit. On October 5, 2005, after an extended court battle, Weinberg was ultimately successful in her bid to replace Baer, with the five previously uncounted ballots opened and cast for Weinberg, providing the necessary margin of victory. Weinberg was sworn into office on November 10, 2005 to assume Baer's vacant seat.

District 37
Each of the forty districts in the New Jersey Legislature has one representative in the New Jersey Senate and two members in the New Jersey General Assembly. The other representatives from the 37th Legislative District for the 2004-2005 Legislative Session were:
 Assemblyman Gordon M. Johnson, and
 Assemblywoman Loretta Weinberg

Family
Baer was a resident of Englewood, New Jersey. He was married to Linda Pollitt Baer, a State Administrative Law Judge and former Bergen County Freeholder. His children are David Baer and Laura Baer and his stepchildren are Lara (Pollitt) Rodriquez and Roger Pollitt. He died on June 24, 2007 following several years of ill-health.

References

External links
 .
 Byron Bear's Resignation Press Release
 New Jersey Senate Democrats Website Biography
 

1929 births
2007 deaths
Columbia University alumni
Cornell University alumni
Democratic Party members of the New Jersey General Assembly
Democratic Party New Jersey state senators
New York University alumni
People from Englewood, New Jersey
Politicians from Bergen County, New Jersey
20th-century American politicians